Rude Awakening is the first live album by American heavy metal band Megadeth. The album was released by Sanctuary Records in 2002, and is the last release before the band broke up in 2002. It was released in both CD and DVD formats.

The album was originally going to be recorded live at a concert in Argentina, but due to the September 11, 2001 attacks, the band decided to record it live in the United States.

Tracks on the album are taken from two live concerts, performed two nights in a row in November 2001. The first night was at the Rialto Theater in Tucson, Arizona, followed the next day by an almost identical performance (to ensure clean audio and video footage, and for a variety of editing options), at the Celebrity Theater in Phoenix, Arizona. Dave Mustaine dedicated the performance of "A Tout le Monde" to the victims of the September 11th attacks and mentions this before performing it. Two previously unreleased tracks from the concert, "The Conjuring" and "Time: The Beginning"/"Use the Man" were released on Still Alive... and Well? (which also features "In My Darkest Hour", "Sweating Bullets", "Symphony of Destruction" and "Holy Wars... The Punishment Due"). "Silent Scorn" can be heard as a tape outro for the band during "Holy Wars".

The tracks on the DVD are all from the second show at the Celebrity Theater in Phoenix, Arizona on November 17, 2001. For the bonus features of the DVD they used recordings from the show in Tucson, Arizona,

This is the only Megadeth album which does not include the band logo or title on the immediate cover. It is located on the side bar of the album instead. The album's cover was designed by graphic designer Storm Thorgerson (noted for his work with Pink Floyd) and Peter Curzon.

This was the end of this line-up of the band. Al Pitrelli, Jimmy DeGrasso played their final show. Dave Ellefson left the band because he wasn't satisfied with his share of the band's earnings. In 2010  he returned to the band. The DVD was certified gold in the US and Canada.

Reception

Brian O'Neill of AllMusic rated Rude Awakening a 3 out of 5, opining that, while he believes the album is "fraught with" limitations, it is "a far better encapsulation of the band's career to date than the spotty Capitol Punishment: The Megadeth Years compilation."

The album won a 2002 Metal Edge Readers' Choice Award for Compilation/Live Album of the Year. Since it was generally believed to be Megadeth's swan song at the time (until their reformation in 2004), the magazine stated, "Megadeth's farewell gets the recognition it deserves."

Track listing

CD

DVD
 Dread and the Fugitive Mind
 Wake Up Dead
 In My Darkest Hour
 She-Wolf
 Reckoning Day
 Devil's Island
 Burning Bridges
 Hangar 18
 Return to Hangar
 Hook in Mouth
 1,000 Times Goodbye
 Mechanix
 Tornado of Souls
 Ashes in Your Mouth
 Sweating Bullets
 Trust
 Symphony of Destruction
 Peace Sells
 Holy Wars... The Punishment Due

DVD bonus features
Megadeth on Megadeth
Paul Gargano on Megadeth (text)
Bonus footage of live show at Rialto Theatre (Tucson, Arizona) on November 16, 2001

 Kill the King
 Angry Again
 Almost Honest
 Train of Consequences
 A Tout le Monde

Personnel
Credits adapted from CD liner notes:

Megadeth
Dave Mustaine – guitars, lead vocals
Dave Ellefson – bass, backing vocals
Al Pitrelli – guitars, backing vocals
Jimmy DeGrasso – drums

Production
 Produced by Megadeth and Bill Kennedy
 Engineered and mixed by Bill Kennedy
 Mastered by Tom Baker
 Cover design by Storm Thorgerson and Peter Curzon

Charts

Certifications

References

Megadeth live albums
Sanctuary Records albums
2002 live albums
Albums with cover art by Storm Thorgerson